The Transport and General Workers' Union is the name of:

 Communication, Transport and General Workers Union, trade union in Trinidad and Tobago
 Irish Transport and General Workers' Union, former trade union in Ireland
 Scottish Transport and General Workers' Union (Docks), former trade union in Scotland
 Transport and General Workers' Union, former trade union in the UK and Ireland
 Transport and General Workers' Union (South Africa), former trade union in South Africa

See also
 Transport Workers Union (disambiguation)